is a Japanese female professional ten-pin bowler. She is a member of the Japan Professional Bowling Association, license no. 384.

Major accomplishments  
 2006 - Pro Bowling Women vs Rookies　(2nd place)
 2007 - G Japan Championship　(4th place)
 2007 - G ROUND1 Cup Ladies　(3rd place)
 2008 - DHC Cup Girls Bowling International　(4th place)
 2009 - Salad Bowl Cup (2nd place)
 2009 - JFE Cup Chiba Women's Open　(winner)
 2009 - 29th Kobe Bowling Pro-Am Festival (winner)
 2009 - 41st All Japan Women's Pro Bowling Championships　(winner)
 2009 - Gunma Open Women (2nd place)
 2009 - 33rd ABS Japan Open　(3rd place)
 2009 - BIGBOX Higashi Yamato Cup (2nd place)
 2010 - 42nd HANDA CUP (winner)
 2010 - 5th MK Charity Cup　(2nd place)
 2010 - ROUND1 Cup Ladies 2010 (winner)
 2010 - Gunma Open　(winner)
 2011 - 43rd All Japan Women's Pro Bowling Championships (winner)
 2011 - 33rd Kansai Women's Open (winner)
 2011 - Miyazaki Open Pro-Am (2nd place)
 2011 - 27th Rokko Queens Open (winner)
 2012 - Chiba Women's Open　(3rd place)
 2013 - Chiba Women's Open　(2nd place)

DHC Tour
 DHC Ladies Bowling Tour 2006/2007 - 5th leg (9th place)
 DHC Ladies Bowling Tour 2006/2007 - 6th leg (6th place)
 DHC Ladies Bowling Tour 2008 - 2nd leg　(runner-up)
 DHC Ladies Bowling Tour 2008 - 4th leg (runner-up)
 DHC Ladies Bowling Tour 2009 - 2nd leg (3rd place)

P★League
 P★League - Tournament 9　(2nd place)
 P★League - Tournament 10　(2nd place)
 P★League - Tournament 17　(3rd place)
 P★League - Tournament 18　(winner)
 P★League - Tournament 19　(winner)
 P★League - Tournament 21　(winner)
 P★League - Tournament 25　(3rd place)
 P★League - Tournament 29　(winner)
 P★League - Tournament 30　(winner)
 P★League - Tournament 31　(winner)
 P★League - Tournament 32　(winner)
 P★League - Tournament 35　(3rd place)
 P★League - Tournament 37　(winner)

References

External links 
Profile @ P-League

1984 births
Living people
People from Yamaguchi Prefecture
Japanese ten-pin bowling players
People from Shimonoseki